The United States competed at the 1976 Summer Olympics in Montreal, Quebec, Canada. 396 competitors, 278 men and 118 women, took part in 189 events in 19 sports.

Medalists
The United States finished third in the final medal rankings, with 34 gold and 94 total medals.

The following U.S. competitors won medals at the games. In the by discipline sections below, medalists' names are bolded. 

|  style="text-align:left; width:78%; vertical-align:top;"|

|  style="text-align:left; width:26%; vertical-align:top;"|

* - Indicates that the athlete competed in preliminaries but not the final.

Archery

After winning both gold medals in the first modern Olympic archery contest at the 1972 Summer Olympics, the US returned only one of the six archers who had competed in Munich, Linda Myers. Even though neither of the reigning gold medallists competed in Montreal, the United States again won both gold medals. Luann Ryon set new Olympic records for women's competition in both the single FITA round and the double FITA round categories. Darrell Pace did the same in the men's competition. All four of the American archers placed in the top eight.

Athletics

Men
Road and track events

Field events

Combined event –  Decathlon

Women
Track events

Field events

Combined event – Pentathlon

Basketball

Summary

Men's tournament
Roster
Phil Ford
Steve Sheppard
Adrian Dantley
Walter Davis
William "Quinn" Buckner
Ernie Grunfeld
Kenneth Carr
Scott May
Michel Armstrong
Thomas LaGarde
Philip Hubbard
Mitchell Kupchak
Head coach: Dean Smith

Preliminary round
Group B

Semifinal

Gold medal game

Women's tournament
Roster
Cindy Brogdon
Susan Rojcewicz
Ann Meyers
Lusia Harris
Nancy Dunkle
Charlotte Lewis
Nancy Lieberman
Gail Marquis
Patricia Roberts
Mary Anne O'Connor
Patricia Head
Julienne Simpson
Head coach: Billie Moore

Boxing

Canoeing

Men

Women

Key: QF – Qualified to medal final; SF – Qualified to semifinal; R – Qualified to repechage

Cycling

Thirteen cyclists represented the United States in 1976.

Road

Track

Pursuit

Sprint

Time trial

Diving

Men

Women

Equestrian

Dressage

Eventing

Jumping

Fencing

18 fencers represented the United States in 1976.

Individual
Men

Women

Team

Gymnastics

Men
Team

Individual finals

Women
Team

Individual finals

Handball

Summary

Judo

Modern pentathlon

Three pentathletes represented the United States in 1976.

Rowing

Men

Women

Qualification legend: FA = Final A (medal); FB = Final B (non-medal); SF = Semifinal; R = Repechage

Sailing

Alternate:Dick Tillman

Shooting

Swimming

Men

Women

* - Athlete swam in the heat but not the final.
Note: Times in the preliminary rounds ranked across all heats.

Weightlifting

Wrestling

Notes

References

Nations at the 1976 Summer Olympics
1976 Summer Olympics
Oly